James Cunningham (born 30 April 1994) is an English rugby league footballer who last played as a  for York Knights in the Betfred Super League.

He has played for Hull F.C. in the Super League, and on loan from Hull at the London Broncos in the top flight and Doncaster in the Championship. He also played for London in the Championship and the Super League before joining the Toronto Wolfpack in the top flight. He joined Toulouse from the Huddersfield Giants.

Background
Cunningham was born in Kingston upon Hull, East Riding of Yorkshire, England.

Career

Hull F.C.
He played for Hull F.C. in the Super League, and on loan from Hull at the London Broncos in the top flight and Doncaster in the Championship.

London Broncos
The London Broncos paid an undisclosed fee to Hull F.C. in 2015. It was his second stint at the London Broncos after being on loan there in the 2014 season in Super League.

On 26 October 2018, Cunningham signed a one-year deal with the London Broncos keeping him at the club until the end of the 2019 season.

Toronto Wolfpack
Cunningham left London to sign for the Toronto Wolfpack during 2019.

Huddersfield Giants
On 9 November 2020, it was announced that Cunningham would join Huddersfield from the 2021 season on a two-year deal.

Toulouse Olympique
On 16 Oct 2021 it was reported that he had signed for Toulouse Olympique in the Super League. He was signed on a two year contract until the end of the 2023 season.

International career
In July 2018 he was selected in the England Knights Performance squad.

Club statistics

References

External links
 (archived by web.archive.org) Profile at hullfc.com
London Broncos profile
SL profile

1994 births
Living people
Doncaster R.L.F.C. players
Huddersfield Giants players
Hull F.C. players
London Broncos players
Rugby league hookers
Rugby league players from Kingston upon Hull
Toronto Wolfpack players
Toulouse Olympique players
York City Knights players